Ataun is a town located at the foot of the Aralar Range in the Goierri region of the province of Gipuzkoa, in the autonomous community of the Basque Country, in the north of Spain. The town consists of three major parishes - San Martin, San Gregorio and Aia - along with several other minor boroughs.

Notable of Ataun 
 Jose Migel Barandiaran, anthropologist, ethnographer and priest

References

External links
 Official Website 
 ATAUN in the Bernardo Estornés Lasa - Auñamendi Encyclopedia (Euskomedia Fundazioa) 

Municipalities in Gipuzkoa